Westview (stylized as westview) is the 6th full album released by MONKEY MAJIK on February 2, 2011 in celebration of their 10-year anniversary. Westview is a follow-up album to their album eastview released in 2005. Most of the tracks recorded for westview were recorded in Greece. The song "Sunshine" was used as the opening song for the anime "ぬらりひょんの孫 (Nurarihyon no Mago)."

Track listing

External links
 Official Web Site of Monkey Majik

References

Monkey Majik albums
2011 albums
Avex Group albums